Sheikh Zayed City is a city in Giza Governorate in Egypt and part of the Greater Cairo urban area. It was established in 1995 and is named after Zayed bin Sultan Al Nahyan.

20th anniversary
In 2014, during the celebration of its 20th anniversary, the Minister of Housing at the time, Mostafa Madbouly, said 'the Urban Communities Authority’s budget had been expanded for the 2014/2015 fiscal year so that all plans may be implemented and completed'. A technology center opened that day in Sheikh Zayed City but residents complained about the lack of other facilities.

Geography
It is bordered to the north by the Cairo-Alexandria desert road, to the south by the 26 July Corridor, and to the west by the neighboring 6th of October.

The city forms part of the Giza Governorate, and is divided into 17 residential districts, with four neighborhoods in each district. 

Sheikh Zayed City sits 226 meters above mean sea level.

Climate
Köppen-Geiger climate classification system classifies its climate as hot desert (BWh). Its climate is very similar to Giza and Cairo, owing to its proximity to them.

Education

Schools
The American International School in Egypt West Campus is located in Sheikh Zayed City.
Beverly Hills Schools (Deutsche Schule Beverly Hills Kairo, American Beverly Hills School, English Beverly Hills School)
The Maharat Super Global School
Elsheikh Zayed Secondary Schools For boys
Elsheikh Zayed Secondary Schools For girls
New Manor House School
Ethos International School
Greenland international school 
American international school
The British School, CAIRO (BISC)

List of universities
The Canadian International University
Faculty of engineering  Cairo University
Faculty of commerce English Section
Nile University
National Training Academy

Residential Compounds 

 Greens
 Aeon Towers
 Swanlake Residences 6th of October
 Village West by Dorra
 Kayan
 Zed Towers
 Elyasmine
 The address
 Rawdet Zayed
 Vye
 The Courtyards
 Cairo Gate
 Casa
 El Patio Zahraa
 Al Karma Gates 
 Etapa
 Alma
 Six West
 Westown Residences
 The Estates
 Belle Ville
 Meadows Park
 Zayed Dunes
 Karmell
 Atrio
 Forty West
 Allegria
 El Rabwa

See also
 Smart Village

References

External links
 El-Sheikh Zayed — specialized hospital
 New Urban Communities Authority

Populated places in Giza Governorate
New towns in Egypt
Cities in Egypt